Koi Jeeta Koi Haara is a 1976 Bollywood film directed by Samir Ganguly.

Cast
Saira Banu   
Farida Jalal   
Seema Kapoor   
Shashi Kapoor   
Sharad Kumar   
Narendra Nath   
Ranjeet   
Romesh Sharma
Siraj Syed

Songs
Lyricist: Anand Bakshi

"Humne Har Ek Galat Kaam Kiya Hai" - Kishore Kumar
"Aaj Hum Tum Dono Chup Rahenge" - Asha Bhosle, Kishore Kumar
"Ban Gayi Baat Baaton Mein" - Asha Bhosle, Kishore Kumar
"Koi Jeeta Koi Haara" - Mohammed Rafi
"O Baba Shaadi Tum Na Karna" - Lata Mangeshkar

External links
 

1976 films
1970s Hindi-language films
Films scored by Laxmikant–Pyarelal
Films directed by Samir Ganguly